Pik-Sen Lim (born 15 September 1944) is a Malaysian-British actress. According to the British Film Institute, Lim was "the most familiar Chinese actor on British television screens in the 1970s and 80s." 

Her notable roles include Chin Lee in the 1971 Doctor Who serial The Mind of Evil, Chung Su-Lee on the ITV sitcom Mind Your Language (1977–79), Tsai Adams on the military drama Spearhead (1978–81), and the killer cleaner in Johnny English Reborn (2011). She was also the narrator for the Dark Souls video game series.

Early life
Lim was born to Malayan Chinese parents in Penang, Straits Settlements (occupied by Japan at the time of her birth), and was the daughter of the palm oil millionaire Lim Cheng-Teik. She attended convent school in Penang, where she was nicknamed "Pixie". Against the wishes of her family, she moved to the United Kingdom at the age of 16 to study at the London School of Dramatic Art.

Her birth name was romanized Lim Phaik-Seng, but she changed her given name to "Pik-Sen" since her British friends would mispronounce "Phaik" as "fake".

Career
In 1964, she appeared in the hospital drama series Emergency – Ward 10, playing a nurse. There she met scriptwriter Don Houghton, whom she married in 1968. The couple's daughter, Sara Houghton, is also an actress; the two women once portrayed characters with the same relationship in Three Thousand Troubled Threads. Sara also appeared in a serial of Doctor Who spin-off The Sarah Jane Adventures called The Curse of Clyde Langer.

She also appeared in Don Houghton scripted Doctor Who serial The Mind of Evil in 1971, and the first three seasons of the sitcom Mind Your Language speaking Penang Hokkien as her Chinese language. Here, she was obliged to speak in an exaggerated, stereotyped Chinese accent. Her later appearances are roles in the short lived soap operas Albion Market (1985) and Night and Day (2003), as well as Arabian Nights (2000), The Bill (2005), and as a character in the comedy series Little Britain (2004).

She is the narrator of the Dark Souls series of video games.

Filmography
 2021   
[   [[vampire academy{tv series}  vampire academy    vampire queen

Theatre

References

External links

1944 births
Living people
People from Penang
British actresses
British actresses of Chinese descent
English people of Chinese descent